Il conte Aquila ("Count Aquila") is a 1955 Italian historical drama film directed by Guido Salvini. Inspired to real life events of  Italian revolutionary Count Federico Confalonieri, it is based on the drama with the same name by Rino Alessi.

Cast 

Rossano Brazzi as Count Federico Confalonieri 
Valentina Cortese as  Teresa Casati
Paolo Stoppa as  Prince Klemens von Metternich
Leonardo Cortese as  Gabrio Casati
Mario Ferrari as  Vitaliano Confalonieri
Elena Zareschi as  Austrian Empress
Tino Buazzelli as  Judge Menghin
Linda Sini as  Marquise Bice
Carlo Tamberlani 
Renato De Carmine 
Tullio Altamura

References

External links

1955 films
1950s biographical drama films
Italian biographical drama films
1955 drama films
Italian black-and-white films
Italian historical drama films
1950s historical drama films
1950s Italian films
1950s Italian-language films